Svend Westergaard  (8 October 1922 – 22 June 1988) was a Danish composer.

See also
List of Danish composers

References
This article was initially translated from the Danish Wikipedia.

Male composers
1922 births
1988 deaths
Academic staff of the Royal Danish Academy of Music
20th-century Danish composers
20th-century Danish male musicians